Rubaiyat Hossain is a Bangladeshi film director, writer, and producer. She made the films Meherjaan (2011), Under Construction (2015) and Made in Bangladesh (2019).

Education
Inspired by the works of Satyajit Ray, Hossain pursued her interest in cinema and completed a diploma in film direction at New York Film Academy in 2002. She has also completed a B. A. in women studies from Smith College, and an M. A. in South Asian studies from the University of Pennsylvania and M. A. in Cinema Studies from Tisch School of the Arts at New York University in the United States. Her primary fields of interest are Sufism, Bengali nationalism, formation of Bengali modernity and its correlation with female sexuality.

Career
Filmmaker Rubaiyat Hossain's works reflect social realism and use a feminist lens to deconstruct the otherwise phallocentric institution of cinema.

Rubaiyat debuted as a feature filmmaker in 2011 with Meherjaan, a film about a Bengali woman's love affair with a Pakistani soldier during Bangladesh's 1971 war of independence. The film was controversial in Bangladesh and pulled down from cinema halls by its distributors just a week after its release. It did however participate at several film festivals and won a handful of awards.

Rubaiyat's next film, Under Construction, was released in 2015 and tells the story of an urban middle-class woman in an unhappy marriage who plays the role of Nandini in Tagore's play Raktakarabi (Red Oleanders). It has been screened at film festivals around the world and received several awards.

Rubaiyat's recent film, Made in Bangladesh, a Bangladesh-France-Denmark-Portugal joint-venture is premiered at the 2019 Toronto International Film Festival following the participation at BFI London Film Festival, Locarno Film Festival and other major festivals. This is a "film on Bangladesh's garment workers spotlights women driving change." Distributed by Pyramide Films, the film was widely released in France on 4 December 2019 and running for several months.

Social work
Rubaiyat has worked for prominent women's rights NGOs in Bangladesh such as Ain O Salish Kendra and Naripokkho. She was also the co-coordinator for the first international workshop on Sexuality and Rights organized by BRAC School of Public Health in 2007.

Filmography
 Meherjaan (2011, Feature, Writer/Director/Producer)
 Under Construction (2015, Feature, Writer/Director/Producer)
 Made in Bangladesh (2019, Feature, Writer/Director/Producer)

Selected awards/honors
Prix Emile Guimet, honored by the Guimet Museum of Paris, France   
Premio Interfedi, Torino Film Festival
Norwegian Peace Film Award, Tromsø International Film Festival
Mahila Parishad Award – Honored by Bangladesh Mahila Parishad for the outstanding contribution in cinema.
Best Emerging Director Award, Asian American International Film Festival, USA 
Public Award, African Diaspora International FF
Jury Prize, Le Festival International du Film d’Amiens

Khona Talkies
Hossain and her partner Ashique Mostafa established Khona Talkies in 2008 with the vision of using young Bangladeshi talent to produce films in a local terrain with possible foreign co-production and creative tie-ups. Since its inception, Khona Talkies has produced a few award-winning and internationally acclaimed as well as locally significant independent films by young filmmakers.

References

Living people
Tisch School of the Arts alumni
Smith College alumni
University of Pennsylvania alumni
Bengali film directors
Best Dialogue National Film Award (Bangladesh) winners
Place of birth missing (living people)
Date of birth missing (living people)
Year of birth missing (living people)